"No Coke" is a song recorded by Sweden-based musician and producer Dr Alban. It was originally released as the B-side of the 12" version of his debut single "Hello Afrika" and became the second single off his debut album, Hello Afrika (1990). Released in November 1990, the song was a hit in several European countries and reached number-one in Sweden. To date, it is one of Dr Alban's most successful songs, along with "It's My Life" and "Sing Hallelujah". It was produced by Denniz Pop, who recorded the song's signature bassline using a Roland Juno-106 synthesizer. The song is performed in English and the lyrics describe a tragic event outside Alban's nightclub Alphabet Street in Stockholm. In November 2017, it was the topic at SVT:s Hitlåtens historia.

Critical reception
Larry Flick from Billboard viewed the song as a "cleverly written anti-drug anthem", "particularly potent and U.S. club-friendly." He added that "pure (and clever) toasting is woven into a fabric of accessible hip-hop and reggae threads" and concluded that the song is "a brilliant piece of work".

Chart performance
"No Coke" was very successful on the charts in Europe, peaking at number-one in Sweden. It spent two weeks at the top spot and 5 weeks within the top 10. The single made it to the top 10 also in Austria, Germany, Greece (#3), the Netherlands, Norway, Portugal, Spain and Sweden. In Austria, it peaked at number two, being held off reaching number-one by Roxette's "Joyride". It spent four weeks at that position. Additionally, "No Coke" was a top 20 hit in Finland and Italy, and a top 30 hit in Belgium. It didn't chart on the UK Singles Chart, but reached number 59 on the UK Dance Singles Chart. The single earned a gold record in Sweden, where the song broke all records by staying for five consecutive weeks at number-one in national radio SR's popular show "Tracks". That's a feat not even achieved by ABBA.

Music video
A music video was produced to promote the single, directed by Scottish director Paul Boyd. He also directed the video for "Hello Afrika". "No Coke" received heavy rotation on MTV Europe and was later published on Dr. Alban's official YouTube channel in December 2011. By December 2022, it had generated more than 18 million views.

Track listings

 7" single
 "No Coke" (radio mix) — 3:43
 "No Coke" (swe-flow-mix) — 3:50

 CD single
 "No Coke" (radio mix) — 3:43
 "No Coke" (swe-flow-mix) — 3:50

Charts and certifications

Weekly charts

Year-end charts

Certifications

References

1990 singles
Dr. Alban songs
Dancehall songs
Number-one singles in Sweden
Songs written by Denniz Pop
Song recordings produced by Denniz Pop
Songs written by Dr. Alban
1990 songs
English-language Swedish songs
Songs about cocaine
Reggae fusion songs
Music videos directed by Paul Boyd